Edward J. Hall, also known as Ned Hall, is an American philosopher and Norman E. Vuilleumier Professor of Philosophy at Harvard University. He is known for his expertise on philosophy of science and epistemology.

Education and career
Hall graduated from Reed College in 1987, and earned his Ph.D. in philosophy at Princeton University in 1996.  He taught at MIT until 2005, when he moved to Harvard.

Books
 2014. The Philosophy of Science: Metaphysical and Epistemological Foundations (Fundamentals of Philosophy), Blackwell, 2014
 2004. Causation and Counterfactuals. Co-edited with L.A. Paul and John Collins. MIT Press, .
 2013. Causation: A User's Guide. with L.A. Paul. Oxford University Press, .

See also
Counterfactuals
Causality

References

External links
 Edward Hall at Harvard
 Panel Discussion - Edward J. Hall
 Laws & Lawmakers: Science, Metaphysics, and the Laws of Nature
 Reality and Rationality

21st-century American philosophers
Analytic philosophers
Philosophers of science
Epistemologists
Philosophy academics
Living people
Harvard University faculty
Reed College alumni
Date of birth missing (living people)
Massachusetts Institute of Technology faculty
Metaphysicians
Princeton University alumni
1966 births